Miraj Grbić (born 17 July 1976) is a Bosnian American film, television and theater actor.

Biography
Grbić graduated from the Academy of Performing Arts in Sarajevo at the University of Sarajevo, where he earned an M.A. degree in acting. Since 1996, he has performed in more than 60 plays on the main stage of the Sarajevo National Theatre. He starred in almost 40 feature films in US, Bosnian, Croatian, German, Austrian, Italian, Irish, Polish, Turkish, Macedonian, Australian and Canadian productions.

He starred as Bogdan in Mission: Impossible – Ghost Protocol, Mitar in Remake, Goran in The Hunting Party, Mustafa in Halima's Path.  Grbić starred in television shows such as American Horror Story, S.W.A.T., Santa Clarita Diet, Gang Related, Ruža vjetrova, Lud, zbunjen, normalan, Viza za budućnost, etc.

From 2010 to 2014, he was the lead singer of Bosnian pop-rock group Karne made out of actors, writers and doctors. With the group, Grbić released one album called Diktatura amatera in 2012.

Personal life
Grbić married Croatian actress Marija Omaljev in 2008. Since 2013, they have been living together in Los Angeles, California, United States. On 15 October 2021, their daughter Billie was born.

Selected filmography

Film

Television

Discography

with Karne
Diktatura amatera - 2012

References

External links

Male actors from Sarajevo
1976 births
Living people
21st-century Bosnia and Herzegovina male actors
Bosnia and Herzegovina male film actors
Bosnia and Herzegovina emigrants to the United States